The Anaconda Commercial Historic District is a historic district in Anaconda, Montana, United States, that is listed on the National Register of Historic Places.

Description
It is roughly bounded by Commercial Avenue, Main Street, Chestnut Street, and Eest Park Avenue in Anaconda.

It includes the Anaconda City Hall and the U.S. Post Office-Anaconda Main which are separately listed on the National Register.

It was listed on the National Register of Historic Places in 1998.

See also

National Register of Historic Places listings in Deer Lodge County, Montana
Butte–Anaconda Historic District

References

External links

Historic districts on the National Register of Historic Places in Montana
Victorian architecture in Montana
Late 19th and Early 20th Century American Movements architecture
Buildings and structures completed in 1888
National Register of Historic Places in Deer Lodge County, Montana
Anaconda, Montana